The 1983 CFL Draft composed of eight rounds where over 72 Canadian football players were chosen from eligible Canadian universities and Canadian players playing in the NCAA. A total of nine players were selected as territorial exemptions, with every team but Montreal making at least one selection during this stage of the draft.

Territorial exemptions
British Columbia Lions                           Jim Mills  OL  Hawaii

Calgary Stampeders  Greg Vavra  QB  Calgary

Edmonton Eskimos  Blake Dermott  OL  Alberta

Hamilton Tiger-Cats  Jim Pendergast  TE  Queen's

Ottawa Rough Riders  Roger Cattelan  OT  Boston College

Ottawa Rough Riders (via Montreal)  Mike Hudson  TE  Guelph

Saskatchewan Roughriders  Scott Redl  DE  Saskatchewan

Toronto Argonauts  Kelvin Pruenster  OT  Cal-Poly

Winnipeg Blue Bombers  Scott Oliver  LB  Moorhead State

1st round

2nd round

3rd round
19. Montreal Concordes                               Blake Nill              DL  Calgary

20. Ottawa Rough Riders                              Sam Benincasa           LB                      Guelph

21. Saskatchewan Roughriders                         Richard White  LB  Simon Fraser

22. Hamilton Tiger-Cats                              Carey Lapa              LB                       British Columbia

23. British Columbia Lions                           William Bickowski       FB  Wilfrid Laurier

24. Calgary Stampeders                               Bill Mintsoulis         WR  Toronto

25. Winnipeg Blue Bombers                            John Pitts  LB  Western Ontario

26. Toronto Argonauts                                Kevin Adams  DB  Waterloo

27. Edmonton Eskimos                                 Rick Makos              G                         Toronto

4th round
28. Montreal Concordes                               Jim Kardash             TE                         Western Ontario

29. Ottawa Rough Riders                              John Kane  OL  Michigan State

30. Saskatchewan Roughriders                         Art Heier               WR                         Waterloo

31. Hamilton Tiger-Cats                              Rory Radford            LB                         Guelph

32. British Columbia Lions                           Jerome Erdman           WR                         Simon Fraser

33. Calgary Stampeders                               Brian Strong            OL  Montana State

34. Winnipeg Blue Bombers                            Pat Cantner             TE                         British Columbia

35. Toronto Argonauts                                Boyd Young              DL  Ottawa

36. Edmonton Eskimos                                 Steve Hall  DB      Guelph

5th round
37. Montreal Concordes                               Steve Nagel             DE                         Wilfrid Laurier

38. Ottawa Rough Riders                              Courtney Taylor  DB  Wilfrid Laurier

39. Saskatchewan Roughriders                         Joel Johnston  FB  Simon Fraser

40. Hamilton Tiger-Cats                              George Piva             T                          British Columbia

41. British Columbia Lions                           Harold Jackman          T  Moorhead State

42. Calgary Stampeders                               Tim Petros              TB                          Calgary

43. Winnipeg Blue Bombers                            Todd Turnbull           G                           Wilfrid Laurier

44. Toronto Argonauts                                Bryan Black             G                           Guelph

45. Edmonton Eskimos                                 Jerry Philip          DB                           York

6th round
46. Montreal Concordes                               Ed Slabikowski         DB  Windsor

47. Ottawa Rough Riders                              Francois Payer         DE  Bishop's

48. Saskatchewan Roughriders                         Todd McGauley          DE                           Western Ontario

49. Hamilton Tiger-Cats                              David Brace            TE  Western Connecticut State

50. British Columbia Lions                           Kyle Barrow            LB                           Western Ontario

51. Calgary Stampeders                               Matt Janes             LB                           Western Ontario

52. Winnipeg Blue Bombers                            Fred Lyseyko           LB  Manitoba

53. Toronto Argonauts                                Joel Tynes             TB                           St. Francis Xavier

54. Edmonton Eskimos                                 Paul Hickle            K  Saskatchewan

7th round
55. Montreal Concordes                               Ken Ross  DE  Carleton

56. Ottawa Rough Riders                              Chris Rhora            DE  Acadia

57. Saskatchewan Roughriders                         Alain Groleau          DB                              Ottawa

58. Hamilton Tiger-Cats                              Mike Zivolak           C                            Western Ontario

59. British Columbia Lions                           Mike Brown  DB  Toronto

60. Calgary Stampeders                               Mike Kurchak           K  Nevada-Las Vegas

61. Winnipeg Blue Bombers                            Dave Bowness           TE                           Manitoba

62. Toronto Argonauts                                Dave Waud              LB                           Wilfrid Laurier

63. Edmonton Eskimos                                 Gord Reinich           SB                           Alberta

8th round
64. Montreal Concordes                               Scott Leckie           DB                            Toronto

65. Ottawa Rough Riders                              Don Clow               WR                            Acadia

66. Saskatchewan Roughriders                         Reindy Dundas          DT  Minot State

67. Hamilton Tiger-Cats                              Jack Kalthof           LB                            Saskatchewan

68. British Columbia Lions                           Ken Munroe             WR                           British Columbia

69. Calgary Stampeders                               Yorg Gromer  TE  Montana-Western

70. Winnipeg Blue Bombers                            Danny Jakobs           DB                            Manitoba

71. Toronto Argonauts                                Rick Van Maanen        DL                            Western Ontario

72. Edmonton Eskimos                                 Jaimie Crawford        QB                            Alberta

References

Canadian College Draft
Cfl Draft, 1983